Lodalskåpa is the highest nunatak on the Norwegian glacier Jostedalsbreen.  It is located on the border between the municipalities of Stryn and Luster in Vestland county, Norway, within Jostedalsbreen National Park.

The first ascent may have happened in 1820 by Gottfried Bohr.  The easiest route to climb Lodalskåpa starts in the village of Bødalen in Stryn, then going up Brattebakken mountain to the Bohr glacier. Around the southern summit to the col, then scrambling to the main summit, approximately one rope length.

Name
The first element is the genitive case of the name of the valley Lodalen, the last element is the finite form of kåpe which means "coat" (here used metaphorically about the glacier surrounding the top–see also Snøhetta). The name of the valley is a compound of lo which means "meadow" and the finite form of dal which means "dale" or "valley".

Media gallery

References

Mountains of Vestland
Luster, Norway
Stryn
Nunataks